Për'puthen ( They match, a pun on the phrase "They kiss") is an Albanian dating reality television series that premiered on 22 September 2019 on Top Channel. The series is created by Olsa Muhameti, directed by Erion Hasanllari, and currently presented by Bora Zemani; with the participation of Arjan Konomi and Neda Balluku as the show's analysts/opinionists. The first season aired only on Sundays. Due to its success, from the second season it started broadcasting five days a week, from Monday to Friday.

Format 
The main purpose of Për'puthen is for people to find their significant other. The female contestants are the ones who have to weekly choose one of the men so they can have a date and get to know each other better. The male contestants have the right to accept or decline their invitations. Every day, pre-recorded dates are shown in the studio and discussed between the contestants, the host, and the analyst, often leading to dynamic debates. It is forbidden for contestants to meet up outside of Top Channel studios, or even talk to one another on the phone. When couples develop feelings and want to get into relationships with each other, they leave the program as matched (të përputhur).

New format (Season 4)

Series overview

Contestants (season 1)

Contestants (season 2)

Females

Males

Contestants (season 3)

Contestants (season 4)

Females

Males 
Remil Peqini

Reception 
Për'puthen is one of the most watched Balkan shows of the recent years. In November 2020, for a total of 60 episodes of the second season only, Për'puthen gained over 100 million views on YouTube. The show continued to grow in popularity and it eventually reached a total of 500 million views for the whole second season, days prior to its finale in May 2021.

Host Bora Zemani was criticized by Perputhen participants many times, for cold and rude behaviour towards them. Zemani was also criticized by fans for creating unnecessary debates between the Perputhen participants and also for telling Ledjana Prenga to leave the studio.

Spin-off shows

Për'puthen Prime 
A continuation of the daily Për'puthen, with more exclusive topics and special guests. Për'puthen Prime was broadcast on Sundays at a duration of 2 hours and began on 3 January 2021 and ended with the last episode on 7 March 2021.

In the third season, the spin-off show was broadcast from 2 October 2021 until 23 April 2022. This season was broadcast every Saturday.

The fourth season will begin airing on 8 January 2023, every Sunday on Top Channel.

Për'puthen +40 
A spin-off of the regular Për'puthen for people over 40 years old. The first contestants were introduced in the finale of Për'puthen Prime on 7 March 2021. Për'puthen +40 started broadcasting on 13 March 2021.

References

External links 
Për'puthen official website
Për'puthen Prime official website

Albanian reality television series
Top Channel original programming
2010s Albanian television series
2020s Albanian television series
2019 Albanian television series debuts
2019 Albanian television seasons
2020 Albanian television seasons
2021 Albanian television seasons
2022 Albanian television seasons
2023 Albanian television seasons
Dating and relationship reality television series